The Richard Wagner Monument is a memorial sculpture of Richard Wagner by Gustav Eberlein, located in Tiergarten in Berlin, Germany. It was created during 1901–1903 and is installed along Tiergartenstraße across from the Indian Embassy. It depicts Wagner in a seated pose and is covered by a roof.

References

External links

 

1903 establishments in Germany
1903 sculptures
Statues in Berlin
Wagner
Outdoor sculptures in Berlin
Richard Wagner
Statues in Germany
Sculptures of men in Germany
Tiergarten (park)